Rear Admiral Shah Iqbal Mujtaba, ndc, psc, BN (born 1948) is former Chief of Staff for the Bangladesh Navy.

Early life
Admiral Mujtaba joined the erstwhile Pakistan Navy as an officer cadet on 11 November 1966, and commissioned in the Executive Branch on 1 June 1970. Mujtaba graduated from the Defence Services Command & Staff College Dhaka and from the National Defence College Dhaka in 2001. Besides He attended Senior International Defence Management Course (SIDMC) at US Naval Postgraduate School in 1993 and Legal Aspect of Military & Peacekeeping Operations Course at the US Naval Justice School in 1998.

Naval commands

As a qualified officer, Rear Admiral Mujtaba commanded various kinds of ships and establishments. He performed as Director of Naval Operations (DNO), Director of Naval Plans (DNP) and Director of Naval Intelligence (DNI) at Naval Headquarters. As a senior officer of Bangladesh Navy Admiral Mujtaba held all kinds of command and staff positions that includes Naval Administrative Authority Dhaka (ADMIN Dhaka), Commodore Commanding Khulna (COMKHUL), Commodore Commanding BN Flotilla (COMBAN) and Commodore Commanding Chittagong (COMCHIT). At Naval Headquarters he served as Assistant Chief of Naval Staff (Operations) and Assistant Chief of Naval Staff (Personnel). Besides his professional duties he also served as Deputy Commandant of Defence Services Command and Staff College, Dhaka. He was also the Senior Directing Staff at the National Defence College, Dhaka.  Mujtaba held a diplomatic appointment as Defence Adviser/Attache in Malaysia. Prior to his appointment as Chief of Naval Staff, he served as  Director General of Bangladesh Coast Guard under the Ministry of Home Affairs.

Rear Admiral Shah Iqbal Mujtaba Appointed as Chief of Naval Staff on 4 June 2002. Admiral Mujtaba came to normal retirement on 10 January 2005 after ending his long 34 years naval service.

Personal life 

Admiral Mujataba married Naima Mujtaba and is blessed with two daughters.

See also 
Military of Bangladesh

References 

|-

Living people
1948 births
Director Generals of Bangladesh Coast Guard
Bangladeshi Navy admirals
Chiefs of Naval Staff (Bangladesh)